Lorna Bourg is an American charity director who is President and Executive Director of the Southern Mutual Help Association (SMHA).

Biography
She graduated from St. Joseph's Academy and received a Master's degree in Psychology from the University of Louisiana at Lafayette, from Harvard University's JFK School of Government in the Sr. Executive's Program, and studied at University of Massachusetts Amherst as well as the University of Wisconsin's Extension Program Community Development.

Bourg co-founded the Southern Mutual Help Association in 1969.

She designed and implemented the Building Rural Communities Program for Economic Development. She designed, and implemented a loan fund for low-income rural homeowners. In 1997, she helped design and implement a pilot programs of the Rural Home Loan Partnership.

Awards
 1992 MacArthur Fellows Program
 Fannie Mae Foundation James A. Johnson Fellow

References

External links
SMHA blog
"COMMUNITY INVESTMENT", PBS, December 20, 2004
"Trying to (Re)build a Better South", Foundation News & Commentary, March/April 2006
“KATRINA COTTAGE:”, Vermilion Faith Community of Care

Living people
University of Louisiana at Lafayette alumni
Harvard Kennedy School alumni
University of Massachusetts Amherst alumni
MacArthur Fellows
Year of birth missing (living people)